We the Kingdom is an American contemporary Christian music band signed to the Capitol Christian Music Group. The band consists of multiple generations of relatives: Andrew Bergthold, Ed Cash, Franni Rae Cash, Martin Cash, and Scott Cash. The band's name comes after the idea that "the kingdom of God is here among us". 

The band released its first singles, "Dancing on the Waves" and the breakout hit single "Holy Water", followed by their debut EP, Live at the Wheelhouse, in 2019. This garnered the band four nominations at the 51st GMA Dove Awards, ultimately winning the Dove Award for New Artist of the Year. In 2020, the band released their debut album, Holy Water which contained the previously released singles "Dancing on the Waves" and "Holy Water" as well as "Don't Tread on Me", "God So Loved" and "Child of Love". The band earned two Grammy Award nominations at the 63rd Annual Grammy Awards, with Holy Water for Best Contemporary Christian Music Album, and the title track being nominated for the Best Contemporary Christian Music Performance/Song. In 2021, the band won the GMA Dove Award for Contemporary Christian Artist of the Year and Pop/Contemporary Album of the Year for Holy Water (2020), and earnt a nomination for the Worship Recorded Song of the Year for "God So Loved" at the 52nd GMA Dove Awards.

History
On August 16, 2019, We the Kingdom released their debut single, "Dancing on the Waves". In September 2019, the band released their second single, "Holy Water". "Holy Water" went on to become the band breakthrough hit single, peaking at No. 2 on the Hot Christian Songs chart. The band released their debut EP, Live at the Wheelhouse, in October 2019. Live at the Wheelhouse reached No. 3 on the Top Christian Albums Chart. 

On April 24, 2020, "Don't Tread on Me" was released as the third single from the album. "Don't Tread on Me" peaked at No. 40 on the Hot Christian Songs chart. On May 29, 2020, We the Kingdom was released "God So Loved". "God So Loved" peaked at No. 4  on the Hot Christian Songs chart. On July 3, 2020, We the Kingdom announced that their debut studio album, Holy Water, will be released on August 7, while releasing "Child of Love" as the first promotional single from the album. "No Doubt About It" was released as the second promotional single from Holy Water on July 24, 2020. We the Kingdom released  Holy Water on August 7, 2020. The album debuted at No. 4 on the Top Christian Albums Chart. On October 30, 2020, the band released "Light of the World (Sing Hallelujah)" as a standalone single. "Light Of The World (Sing Hallelujah)" peaked at No. 29 on the Hot Christian Songs chart.

At the 51st GMA Dove Awards in October 2020, We the Kingdom was nominated for four awards, these being New Artist of the Year, Song of the Year and Pop/Contemporary Recorded Song of the Year for "Holy Water", and Pop/Contemporary Album of the Year for Live at the Wheelhouse, with the band only winning the New Artist of the Year award. Billboard named We the Kingdom the Top New Christian Artist of 2020.

On January 29, 2021, the band released "Child of Love" featuring Bear Rinehart of Needtobreathe as the fifth single from Holy Water (2020). "Child of Love" peaked at No. 5 on the Hot Christian Songs chart. At the 63rd Annual Grammy Awards in March 2021, We the Kingdom received two nominations, with "Holy Water" being nominated for the Best Contemporary Christian Music Performance/Song, and Holy Water for Best Contemporary Christian Music Album.

We the Kingdom received three nominations for the 2021 GMA Dove Awards for Contemporary Christian Artist of the Year, Pop/Contemporary Album of the Year for Holy Water, and Worship Recorded Song of the Year for "God So Loved", the band winning the GMA Dove Awards for Contemporary Christian Artist of the Year and Pop/Contemporary Album of the Year for Holy Water.

Discography

Studio albums

Live albums

Extended plays

Singles

Promotional singles

Other charted songs

Other appearances

Tours
Headlining
 We the Kingdom - Touring the Holy Water Album Tour (2021)
 We the Kingdom Live Tour (2022)
 Castings Crowns and We the Kingdom USA Tour with Casting Crowns (2022)

Supporting
 Winter Jam 2021 Tour with Crowder (2021)
 My People Tour with Crowder, Anne Wilson and Patrick Mayberry (2022)

Awards and nominations

Billboard Music Awards

!Ref.
|-
| 2021
| Holy Water
| Top Christian Album
| 
| 
|}

GMA Dove Awards

!Ref.
|-
| rowspan="4" | 2020
| We the Kingdom
| New Artist of the Year
| 
| rowspan="4" | 
|-
| rowspan="2" | "Holy Water"
| Song of the Year 
| 
|-
| Pop/Contemporary Recorded Song of the Year 
| 
|-
| Live at the Wheelhouse
| Pop/Contemporary Album of the Year 
| 
|-
| rowspan="3" | 2021
| We the Kingdom
| Contemporary Christian Artist of the Year
| 
| rowspan="3" | 
|-
| Holy Water
| Pop/Contemporary Album of the Year 
| 
|-
| "God So Loved"
| Worship Recorded Song of the Year
| 
|-
| rowspan="2" | 2022
| We the Kingdom
| Artist of the Year
| 
| rowspan="2" | 
|-
| A Family Christmas
| Christmas/Special Event Album of the Year
| 
|-
|}

Grammy Awards

!Ref.
|-
| rowspan="2" | 2021
| "Holy Water"
| Best Contemporary Christian Music Performance/Song
| 
| rowspan="2" | 
|-
| Holy Water
| Best Contemporary Christian Music Album
| 
|}

References

External links
 

Capitol Records artists
American Christian musical groups